Handsworth Wood is a suburb of Birmingham in the West Midlands County, England.

Located within the metropolitan county of the West Midlands since 1 April 1974, under the Local Government Act 1972, it was previously a part of the county of Staffordshire. It is also a ward within the formal district of Perry Barr as well as other areas such as Great Barr, Sandwell and Hamstead/Hamstead Village.

Handsworth Wood is regarded as one of the premier residential areas in Birmingham, due to the significant number of imposing Victorian detached and semi-detached houses. Also the area is highly sought after due to the access to parks such as Handsworth Park, golf clubs and the open spaces of Sandwell Valley Country Park.

Handsworth Wood is regarded by estate agents as upmarket in comparison to the neighbouring district of Handsworth.

History
Handsworth Wood was the woodland belonging to the manor of Handsworth and lay in the north of the manor. It is the 'woodland half a league long & the same wide' which is cited in the Domesday Book in 1086.

By the end of the 19th century there was only scattered building development in this rural area, some of it very large houses for the wealthy. Beyond Friary Road/ Handsworth Wood Road was still farmland. It was between the two World Wars and up to the 1950s that Handsworth Wood was developed largely with private housing. It is an area that has maintained its middle-class status to the present.

The area had its own Railway station until 1941 known as Handsworth Wood railway station. The station site lies in a cutting through Handsworth Park, adjacent to St. Mary's Church.

Birmingham historian Dr. Carl Chinn noted that during World War II the boundary between Handsworth and Handsworth Wood marked the line between being safe and unsafe from bombing, with Handsworth Wood being an official evacuation zone due to its very country like, undeveloped landscape. Due to the affluent residents of the area properties are larger than usual sizes meaning Handsworth Wood was ideal for evacuees etc.

Mr Hudson, the singer/songwriter, was born in Handsworth Wood.

James Watt, the engineer/inventor, lived in Handsworth Wood.

Matthew Boulton also worked alongside James Watt, was born and raised in the area.

Population

The 2001 Population Census recorded that 25,276 people were living in the ward. It has a high percentage of ethnic minorities in the area with the figure being 67.1% (16,975) of the population being of an ethnic minority, mainly of British Indian heritage, as opposed to 29.6% for Birmingham in general.

Ethnic Groups
White British – 7,427
South Asian – 12,052
Black British – 4,100
Mixed Race – 877
A large majority of the Handsworth Wood area consists of ethnic minorities with over 50% of residents being British Indian.

Education
The primary schools in the area include Cherry Orchard Primary School, St Teresa's Catholic Primary School and Grestone Primary School.

The secondary schools in the area include Hamstead Hall Academy and King Edward VI Handsworth Wood Girls' Academy.

It is home to 'Hamstead Campus' a privately owned student accommodation.

Nearby to Handsworth Wood are the Grammar Schools of King Edward VI Handsworth Girl's Grammar School and Handsworth Grammar School, Soho Road,

Sporting facilities
Handsworth Wood is home to numerous sports facilities. Handsworth Wood Bowling Club is located on Devonshire Road. The Bridge Trust Cricket Club is on Romilly Avenue. Hamstead Diamonds Tennis Club is located on Craythorne Road. The highly regarded Handsworth Golf Club is also located here with the entrance on Sunningdale Close (off Craythorne Road).

Places of interest
Local amenities include: St. Mary's Church, Handsworth and Handsworth Park. The Anchorage is a grade II* listed building,

Transport
The area is well served by Bus routes 16, 11C and the 101. The nearest railway station is Hamstead railway station.

Local politics
There is a Birmingham City electoral ward called Handsworth Wood comprising part of Handsworth and nearly all of Handsworth Wood made up of distinct cultures and built environments – the salubrious Victorian suburb, consisting of some of the finest Victorian houses in the city, increasingly being refurbished to complement the £9 million restoration of Handsworth Park, and Handsworth Wood dominated by characteristically suburban pre-war semi-detached and detached properties. The ward was formerly known as Sandwell Ward.

The ward is represented by three Labour councillors in the Birmingham City Council; Gurdial Singh Atwal, Paulette Hamilton and Narinder Kooner.

See also
Browns Green
Hamstead
Handsworth, West Midlands
Great Barr
Perry Barr

References

External links
Birmingham City Council: Handsworth Wood Ward

Areas of Birmingham, West Midlands
Wards of Birmingham, West Midlands